Matheus Pucinelli de Almeida and Thiago Agustín Tirante were the defending champions, but both players were no longer eligible to participate in junior events.

Flavio Cobolli and Dominic Stricker won the title, defeating Bruno Oliveira and Natan Rodrigues in the final, 6–2, 6–4.

Seeds

Draw

Finals

Top half

Bottom half

References

External links 
Draw at rolandgarros.com
Draw at ITFtennis.com

Boys' Doubles
French Open by year – Boys' doubles